The Kubena is a river in Konoshsky District of Arkhangelsk Oblast and Vozhegodsky, Syamzhensky, Kharovsky, Sokolsky, and Ust-Kubinsky Districts of Vologda Oblast in Russia. The Kubena is the principal tributary of Lake Kubenskoye and belongs to the basins of the Sukhona and the White Sea. Its main tributaries are the Syamzhena (left) and the Sit (right).

The town of Kharovsk is situated on the left bank of the river. The selo of Ustye, Ust-Kubinsky District, Vologda Oblast, and administrative center of Ust-Kubinsky District, is located in the mouth of the Kubena.  

The river basin of the Kubena comprises vast areas in the center of Vologda Oblast and in the south of Arkhangelsk oblast and separates the river basins of the Onega in the west and the Vaga in the east. Four district centers of Vologda Oblast, Syamzha, Kharovsk, and Ustye, are located in the basin of the Kubena.

The source of the Kubena is located in the hills south of the settlement of Konosha. The river flows south, enters Vologda Oblast, turns northeast and crosses Vozhegodsky District, turning south, and eventually southwest. It accepts the Syamzhena from the left and turns west. Downstream of the town of Kharovsk the Kubena accepts the Sit from the right and eventually turns southwest. Exiting Kharovsky District, a stretch of the Kubena forms the border between Ust-Kubinsky District (right) and Sokolsky District (left). Further the Kubena enters Ust-Kubinsky district and empties into Lake Kubenskoye, forming a river delta.

References

External links

Rivers of Vologda Oblast
Rivers of Arkhangelsk Oblast